Gritulu is an archaeological site in Corsica. It is located in the commune of Luri, Haute-Corse.

References 

Archaeological sites in Corsica